Sodium pyrosulfate is an inorganic compound with the chemical formula of Na2S2O7. It is a colorless salt.

Preparation
Sodium pyrosulfate is obtained by the dehydration of sodium bisulfate:

 2 NaHSO4 → Na2S2O7 + H2O

Temperatures above 460 °C further decompose the compound, producing sodium sulfate and sulfur trioxide:

 Na2S2O7 → Na2SO4 + SO3

Applications
Sodium pyrosulfate was used in analytical chemistry. Samples are fused with sodium  pyrosulfate to ensure complete dissolution before a quantitative analysis.

See also
Pyrosulfate
Potassium bisulfate
Potassium pyrosulfate

References

Sodium compounds
Pyrosulfates